Suzie Gold is a 2004 British dramedy film directed by Richard Cantor and starring American actress Summer Phoenix. It is Cantor's directorial debut. It was released by Pathé on 5 March 2004 in the United Kingdom.

Plot
The film stars Summer Phoenix as the title character, in the role of a young Jewish woman living in London with a sister who is about to marry a young Jewish man. Breaking with her secularized yet traditionally-inclined family, Suzie falls in love with the non-Jewish Darren (Leo Gregory). She fears introducing him to her family because of their opposition to intermarriage.

Cast
Summer Phoenix as Suzie Gold
Leo Gregory as Darren
Daniel Mendoza as Richard Levine
Rachel Stevens as Tina 
Iddo Goldberg as Anthony Silver
Ariana Fraval as Sophie Gold
Stanley Townsend as Irving Gold
Rebecca Front as Barbara Gold
Gem Souleyman as Toby Gold
Sophie Winkleman as Debby Levine
Roger Kitter as Tony "Tiny" Levine
Kevin Bishop as Ashley Marks
Fiz Marcus as Hope Levine
Dave Cohen as Grabber at Wedding
Steve Jameson as Leo Spencer
Frances Barber as Joyce Spencer
Harriet Thorpe as Charity Silver
Michelle Chadwick as Non-Jewish Wife
Daniel Rabin as Jewish Husband

Reception
The BBC rated the film 3 out of 5 stars. The reviewer compared it to My Big Fat Greek Wedding and noted the influence of Woody Allen in the humour. Time Out praised Phoenix's "versatility" yet felt the central romantic union of the film lacked "conviction". The magazine continued; "More amusement derives from the old stagers of the Jewish community (including Townsend, Front and Barber) and their attitudes to sex, marriage and culture, their gossipy antics spawning some neat one liners and farcical set pieces."Total Film gave the film 3 out of 5 stars, praising Phoenix' performance and the "acutely observed local detail".

Soundtrack
The soundtrack, created by James Hyman, features an original song called "Want You More" by Sophie Ellis-Bextor.

References

External links

2004 films
Films set in London
Films about Jews and Judaism
British comedy-drama films
2004 comedy-drama films
2004 comedy films
2004 drama films
2000s English-language films
2000s British films